Akira Yamaguchi (山口 晃) (born 1969 in Tokyo, Japan) is a Japanese contemporary artist.

Biography 
Born in Tokyo, he grew up in the city of Kiryū, Gunma Prefecture.

He received his B.A. in oil painting (1994) and M.A. in oil painting (1996) from the Tokyo University of the Arts. Yamaguchi designed the cover art for the album V by the nu-jazz music duo United Future Organization and illustrated the book Chronicles of My Life: An American in the Heart of Japan by Donald Keene.

He lives and works in Tokyo. His artwork has been exhibited worldwide.

Style 
Yamaguchi's painting style combines contemporary oil painting techniques with the traditional Japanese composition style known as Yamato-e. He has also produced a number of drawings and ukiyo-e.

See also 
 List of Japanese artists

References

External links
 Akira Yamaguchi at Mizuma Art Gallery
 Akira Yamaguchi at Nadiff

1969 births
Living people
Artists from Tokyo